Forever Ever may refer to:
"Forever Ever", a song by Trippie Red from the 2018 album Life's a Trip
"Forever Ever", a song by Miami Horror from the 2015 album All Possible Futures